Rhonda Roland Shearer is an American sculptor, scholar, and journalist, who founded the nonprofit organization Art Science Research Laboratory with her late husband Stephen Jay Gould. The mission statement avows that the lab aims to "infuse intellectual rigor and critical thinking in disciplines that range from Academics to Journalism. ASRL researches conventional beliefs and misinformation and transmits its findings by means of scientific methods and state-of-the-art computer technologies."

Sculpture
As a sculptor, she has exhibited her work in New York City, Los Angeles and London, as well as smaller cities throughout the United States. One of her works reflected her feminist principles by calling attention to the gender disparity in the public art that New York City commissions. Of the hundreds of monuments erected in the city, she emphasized, only three depict real women: Gertrude Stein, Eleanor Roosevelt and Joan of Arc. In the traveling museum exhibition catalogue, Shearer described her exhibition "Woman's Work" by writing, "I depicted large scale images of motherhood and housework in heroic size, as are our most sacred monuments." The New York Times profiled the exhibit in an article "Celebrating Heroines of Drudgery".<ref>"Celebrating Heroines of Drudgery", New York Times, March 11, 1993.</ref>

In 1996, she exhibited Shapes Of Nature, 10 Years Of Bronze Sculptures in The New York Botanical Garden, which experimented in the use of fractals as a new way to look at space and form. Whereas many mathematicians like Benoit Mandelbrot understood fractals in the form of computerized models of equations, others like Nathaniel Friedman and Shearer recognized that fractals are also found in nature. The Economist quoted her as saying, "For the artists, nothing is more fundamental."

Always fascinated by the intersection between science and art, Shearer exhibited Pangea—inspired by chaos theory—in New York and Los Angeles from 1990 to 1991.

Some of Shearer's bronze sculptures purchased by art collector, Leonard Stern, were inadvertently destroyed, with the bronze flowers discarded.

Art historyForbes has called her an expert on Dadaist art. Shearer has posited that many of Marcel Duchamp's supposedly "readymade" works of art were actually created by Duchamp. Research that Shearer published in 1997, "Marcel Duchamp's Impossible Bed and Other 'Not' Readymade Objects: A Possible Route of Influence From Art To Science", lays out these arguments. In the paper, she showed that research of items like snow shovels (In Advance of the Broken Arm) and bottle racks (Bottle Rack) in use at the time failed to turn up any identical matches to photographs of the originals. However, there are accounts of Walter Arensberg and Joseph Stella being with Duchamp when he purchased the original Fountain at J. L. Mott Iron Works. Such investigations are hampered by the fact that few of the original "readymades" survive, having been lost or destroyed. Those that exist today are predominantly reproductions Duchamp authorized or designed in the final two decades of his life. Shearer also asserts that the artwork L.H.O.O.Q., a poster-copy of the Mona Lisa with a moustache drawn on it, is not the true Mona Lisa, but Duchamp's own slightly-different version that he modelled partly after himself. The inference of Shearer's viewpoint is that Duchamp was creating an even larger joke than he admitted.

The 'accounts' of Walter Arensberg and Joseph Stella are hearsay accounts, no one has any proof of the three actually making a urinal purchase, namely in the form of receipts, other witnesses, etc.

Journalism and media ethics
Art Science Research Laboratory also operates the media ethics websites StinkyJournalism.org and CheckYourFacts.org. Both websites use the scientific method to critique the mainstream media and uncover hoaxes.

Monster Pig

StinkyJournalism.org gained widespread media attention after it uncovered evidence that the shooting of a "Monster Pig" was, in fact, a hoax. "Monster Pig", also known as "Hogzilla II" and "Pigzilla", is the name of a large domestic farm-raised pig that was shot during a canned hunt on May 3, 2007, by an eleven-year-old boy, Jamison Stone. The location is disclosed as a  low fence enclosure within the larger  commercial hunting preserve called Lost Creek Plantation, outside Anniston, Alabama, USA. According to the hunters (there were no independent witnesses), the pig weighed 1,051 lb (477 kg).

Several days after the story broke, suspicion mounted over the authenticity of the photographic evidence. StinkyJournalism.org interviewed a retired New York University physicist, Dr. Richard Brandt, who used perspective geometry to measure the photograph and showed that, as represented, the pig would be 15 ft (4.57 m) long—much larger than the  claimed. Brandt's measurements also showed that the boy in the photo was standing several metres behind the pig, creating the optical illusion that the animal was larger than its actual size. Others claim the photographs were digitally altered.

StinkyJournalism.org discovered that although the Lost Creek Plantation web site boasted that the hunting there was "legendary", the operation was only four months old at the time of the hunt. Eddy Borden had big plans for developing his canned-hunt operation, the Clay County Times reported shortly before the hunt.

In the aftermath of the story, an Alabama grand jury investigated the 11-year-old aspiring sharpshooter Jamison Stone on animal cruelty charges, along with his father Mike Stone, expedition leaders Keith O'Neal and Charles Williams, and Lost Creek Plantation grounds owner Eddy Borden.

The article ("Exclusive: Grand jury to investigate 'monster pig' kill") revealed information  subpoenaed by the Clay County District Attorney Fred Thompson, which includes hundreds of hours of on-the-record interviews and research by StinkyJournalism.org director Rhonda Roland Shearer.

 Relief work 
Following the September 11 attacks in 2001, Shearer and her daughter worked to deliver supplies to firefighters and other personnel at the site of the destroyed World Trade Center in Manhattan. After being disappointed with her attempts to donate through official channels, she began distributing supplies directly to emergency workers; donated items included gloves, face masks, hard hats, T-shirts, underwear, pants, jackets, and tools. Shearer later told The Washington Post'' that she had borrowed $1 million to finance her efforts, repaying the debt after the crisis with the help of money donated from foundations and individuals.

During the COVID-19 pandemic in 2020, Shearer worked to distribute personal protective equipment (PPE), such as masks, gloves, and hazmat suits, to firefighters, hospital workers, and low-income individuals. She again faced resistance from officials, as hospitals refused to allow her to donate on their property, forcing her to set up distribution areas nearby. As of May 6, 2020, Shearer reportedly borrowed more than $600,000 on a home equity line of credit to fund the donations and was raising additional money through GoFundMe.

Personal life 
Shearer was married to inventor H. Joseph Allen.

In 1995, she married Stephen Jay Gould. The two lived in the SoHo neighborhood of Manhattan until his death in 2002.

Following Gould's death, Shearer had a fifteen-year relationship with Ronald Spadafora until his death in 2018. Spadafora had supervised the New York City Fire Department recovery efforts after the September 11 attacks, and his death from cancer was attributed to his exposure to the World Trade Center site.

Shearer has two children, London and Jade.

References

Living people
American sculptors
American art historians
Women art historians
American women journalists
Feminist artists
American women historians
Year of birth missing (living people)
21st-century American women